Draco maculatus, commonly known as the spotted flying dragon or spotted gliding lizard, is a species of agamid flying lizard endemic to Southeast Asia. It is capable of gliding from tree to tree.

Description
Head small; snout a little longer than the diameter of the orbit; nostril lateral, directed outwards; tympanum scaly. Upper head-scales unequal, strongly keeled; a compressed prominent scale on the posterior part of the superciliary region; 7 to 11 upper labials. The male's gular appendage very large, always much longer than the head, and frequently twice as long; female also with a well-developed but smaller gular sac. Male with a very small nuchal crest. Dorsal scales but little larger than the ventrals, irregular, smooth or very feebly keeled; on each side of the back a series of large trihedral keeled distant scales. The fore limb stretched forwards reaches beyond the tip of the snout; the adpressed hind limb reaches a little beyond the elbow of the adpressed fore limb, or to the axilla. Greyish above, with more or less distinct darker markings; a more or less distinct darker interorbital spot; wing-membranes above with numerous small round black spots, which are seldom confluent, beneath immaculate or with a few black spots; a blue spot on each side of the base of the gular appendage.

From snout to vent length, ; tail, .

Subspecies
The following four subspecies (or races) are recognized, including the nominotypical subspecies:

Draco maculatus divergens Taylor, 1934: NW Thailand; type locality = "Chiang Mai, N Siam"; restricted to "Doi Suthep Mountain" by Taylor, 1963.
Draco maculatus haasei Boettger, 1893: E Thailand, Cambodia, S Vietnam; type locality = "Chantaboon, Siam".
Draco maculatus maculatus (Gray, 1845)
Draco maculatus whiteheadi Boulenger, 1900: N Vietnam, Hainan; type locality = "Five-finger Mountains, interior of Hainan".

Geographic range
From Assam and Yunnan to Singapore.

Southern China (Hainan, Guangxi, Yunnan, Tibet), India (E. Himalayas to Assam), Bangladesh (Satchari National Park, Sylhet), Myanmar, Laos, Vietnam, Thailand and W. Malaysia.

Notes

References
 Boettger O. 1893. "Ein neuer Drache (Draco) aus Siam". Zool. Anz. 16: 429-430.
 Boulenger GA. 1885. Catalogue of the Lizards in the British Museum (Natural History). Second Edition. Volume I. Geckonidæ, Eublepharidæ, Uroplatidæ, Pygopodidæ, Agamidæ. London: Trustees of the British Museum (Natural History). (Taylor and Francis, printers). xii + 436 pp. + Plates I- XXXII. (Draco maculatus, pp. 262–263).
 Boulenger GA. 1900. "On the reptiles, batrachians (and fishes) collected by the late Mr. John Whitehead in the interior of Hainan". Proc. Zool. Soc. London 1899: 956-959.
 Cantor TE. 1847. "Catalogue of reptiles inhabiting the Malayan Peninsula and Islands". J. Asiatic Soc. Bengal [Calcutta] 16 (2): 607-656, 897-952, 1026–1078.
 Gray JE. 1845. Catalogue of the Specimens of Lizards in the Collection of the British Museum. London: Trustees of the British Museum. (Edward Newman, printer). xxvii + 289 pp. (Dracunculus maculatus, p. 236).
 Günther A. 1861. "Second list of Siamese reptiles". Ann. Mag. Nat. Hist., Third Series 8: 266-268.
 McGuire, Jimmy A.; Heang, Kiew Bong. 2001. "Phylogenetic systematics of Southeast Asian flying lizards (Iguania: Agamidae: Draco) as inferred from mitochondrial DNA sequence data". Biological Journal of the Linnean Society  72: 203-229.
 Smith MA. 1935. The Fauna of British India, Including Ceylon and Burma. Reptilia and Amphibia. Vol. II.—Sauria. London: Secretary of State for India in Council. (Taylor and Francis, printers). xiii + 440 pp. + Plate I + 2 maps. (Draco maculatus, pp. 138–140, Figure 42 + Figure 41 A on p. 136).

External links
 
 https://web.archive.org/web/20051203120649/http://www.calacademy.org/research/herpetology/myanmar/checklist_lizards.html
 http://www.ecologyasia.com/html-menu/species-list.htm

Reptiles of Southeast Asia
Reptiles of Thailand
maculatus
Taxa named by John Edward Gray
Reptiles described in 1845